Eugênio de Castro is a municipality of the northern part of the state of Rio Grande do Sul, Brazil. The population is 2,352 (2020 est.) in an area of 419.32 km². It is located 435 km west of the state capital of Porto Alegre, northeast of Alegrete.

Bounding municipalities

Entre-Ijuís
Coronel Barros
Augusto Pestana
Jóia
São Miguel das Missões

References

External links
http://www.citybrazil.com.br/rs/eugeniodecastro/ 

Municipalities in Rio Grande do Sul